Dan Mahoney may refer to:

Dan Mahoney (journalist) (1916–1999), Irish-American journalist investigated for possible Communist activities
Dan Mahoney (baseball) (1864–1904), baseball player
Dan Mahoney (politician) (1909–1996), Australian politician
Dan Mahoney (author) (1947-), American detective novelist